Thomandersia is the sole genus in the Thomandersiaceae, an African family of flowering plants. Thomandersia is a genus of shrubs and small trees, with six species native to Central and West Africa.

Thomandersia traditionally has been classified within the family Acanthaceae based on morphology by several authors, including APG I 1998, APG II 2003, and in Schlegeliaceae at APG Website Missouri Botanical Garden, in a list of genera of this family, but Stevens argues further that should be considered out of this taxon by weak support and regarded Thomandersiaceae.

The genus was elevated to family status, previously by Sreemadhavan 1976  and 1977  on the basis of leaf anatomy and anther morphology, and more recently by Wortley et al. 2005  and 2007, based on phylogenetic analyses of genetic material.

The genus was described with this name in 1892 by French botanist Henri Ernest Baillon.

Species
The genus includes the following species:

 Thomandersia anachoreta Heine - Liberia, Ivory Coast
 Thomandersia butayei De Wild. - Republic of the Congo, Gabon, Democratic Republic of the Congo
 Thomandersia congolana De Wild. & T. Durand - Republic of the Congo, Democratic Republic of the Congo, Cameroon, Equatorial Guinea
 Thomandersia hensii De Wild. & T. Durand - from Nigeria to Angola
 Thomandersia laurentii De Wild. - Republic of the Congo, Democratic Republic of the Congo
 Thomandersia laurifolia (T. Anderson ex Benth.) Baill. -  Nigeria, Republic of the Congo, Democratic Republic of the Congo, Cameroon, Equatorial Guinea

References

Lamiales
Lamiales genera
Flora of West Tropical Africa
Taxa named by Henri Ernest Baillon